Marcus Nummius Senecio Albinus (fl. 3rd century AD) was a Roman senator who was appointed consul in AD 227 with Marcus Laelius Fulvius Maximus Aemilianus. Nothing else of his career has been preserved.

Biography
Senecio Albinus was the son of Marcus Nummius Umbrius Primus Senecio Albinus who had been consul in AD 206, and the step-brother of Lucius Roscius Aelianus Paculus Salvius Iulianus, the consul of AD 223. He was the father of Marcus Nummius Tuscus, consul of AD 258, and may also have been the father of Marcus Nummius Albinus, who was consul ordinarius in AD 263.

Sources
 Mennen, Inge, Power and Status in the Roman Empire, AD 193-284 (2011)

References

3rd-century Romans
Imperial Roman consuls
Year of birth unknown
Year of death unknown